Christopher David "Chris" Duplanty (born October 21, 1965, in Palo Alto, California) is a former water polo goalkeeper from the United States, who competed in three Summer Olympics (1988, 1992 and 1996) for his native country. He won the silver medal with the US Men's National Team at the 1988 Summer Olympics in Seoul, South Korea. In 2001, he was inducted into the USA Water Polo Hall of Fame.

See also
 List of Olympic medalists in water polo (men)
 List of men's Olympic water polo tournament goalkeepers

References

External links
 
 Chris Duplanty profile at The Washington Post

1965 births
Living people
People from the San Francisco Bay Area
American male water polo players
Water polo goalkeepers
Water polo players at the 1988 Summer Olympics
Water polo players at the 1992 Summer Olympics
Water polo players at the 1996 Summer Olympics
Medalists at the 1988 Summer Olympics
Olympic silver medalists for the United States in water polo
American water polo coaches
Punahou School alumni
Pan American Games gold medalists for the United States
Water polo players at the 1995 Pan American Games
Pan American Games medalists in water polo
Medalists at the 1995 Pan American Games